Essex station may refer to:

Essex station (Montana), an Amtrak station in Essex, Montana, USA
Essex Station, Connecticut, former name of Centerbrook, Connecticut
Essex Freight Station, a disused station in Centerbrook, Connecticut
Essex railway station (Ontario), a train station in Essex, Ontario, Canada

See also
Essex (disambiguation)
Essex Street (disambiguation)
Essex Junction station
Essex Road railway station